John David Ward (born 27 April 1962) is an Australian cricket umpire. In April 2020, Ward announced his retirement from elite umpiring.

Umpiring career
He made his international debut on 28 January 2013, in a Twenty20 match between Australia and Sri Lanka. He stood in his first ODI game in 2014. On 1 December 2015 during a Ranji Trophy game, Ward was struck on the head from a shot played by Barinder Sran.

He stood in 87 First-class, 84 List A and 117 T20 matches.

See also
 List of One Day International cricket umpires
 List of Twenty20 International cricket umpires

References

1962 births
Living people
Australian cricket umpires
Australian One Day International cricket umpires
Australian Twenty20 International cricket umpires
Sportspeople from Melbourne